Marika Krevata (Greek: Μαρίκα Κρεβατά; 12 June 1910 – 14 September 1994) was a Greek actress of theatre and film.

Biography
Marika Krevata was the daughter of Stamatis Krevatas (musician) and his wife, Sofia. She was born in Athens in 1910. When she was a child, her father and younger sister, Thaleia, both died. She first appeared in theatre at an early age. In the beginning she toured Greece with children's acts including Daskalitsa (Δασκαλίτσα). She later appeared in operettas by Georgios Xydis. She also spent time with Manos Filippidis's theatre company.

Personal life
Her first husband was Angelos Mavropoulos; the couple had one child, Gelly. She married, secondly, to Giorgos Gavriilidis (died in 1982).

She retired in 1972, and died on 14 September 1994, aged 84, at the Athens Clinic. In the last years of her life, she suffered from dementia. She is interred in Kokkinos Milos Cemetery.

Filmography

External links

1910 births
1994 deaths
Deaths from dementia in Greece
Actresses from Athens
Greek stage actresses
Greek film actresses
20th-century Greek actresses